Monkey Run is an unincorporated community in Baxter County, Arkansas, United States.

References

Unincorporated communities in Baxter County, Arkansas
Unincorporated communities in Arkansas